Sahasa Simha is a 1982 Indian Kannada-language action crime thriller film directed by Joe Simon and produced by M. Pandurangan and M. Ramalingam. The film stars Vishnuvardhan, Kajal Kiran, Rajya Lakshmi and Vajramuni. The film has musical score by Chellapilla Satyam. Cinematography was handled by H. G. Raju.

The film is based on the novel Chakravyuha by Manu but the similarities with Ronald Neame's film The Odessa File (1974) have been widely discussed. The film centers around a child kidnapping racket operating in Bombay. Inspector Pratap (Vishnuvardhan) has been ordered to bring the people running the racket to justice.

The film was a huge box office success. The film was a milestone in the Kannada film industry, achieving cult status in Karnataka. The film was instrumental in heightening the stardom of Vishnuvardhan. Following the success of the film, a series of similar films of the action genre were made starring Vishnuvardhan in the lead.

Plot
Prathap is a cop in Bangalore who, along with his sister Lakshmi are raised by Pratap's superior Chowdhary as his own children. One day, Prathap and Chowdhary investigates the murder of a person named Dheerajlal where they find a diary. Prathap reads the diary which depicts that Dheerajlal's real name is Shankaralal and had associated with Rathanlal and his friend Peter, who run a child trafficking racket. Shankarlal felt guilty by witnessing the child trafficking activities, including a child, who became a victim of an acid attack by Rathanlal and Peter. Shankarlal realized his mistake and had left the gang to lead a peaceful life after witnessing the boy reunited with his father.

Learning this, Prathap seeks Chowdhary's approval to go undercover in catching the gangs involved in the racket. Though reluctant, Chowdhary accepts. Prathap leaves for Mumbai and joins the Mumbai Police Force where he meets Nandalal from the department, who reveals that Rathanlal and Peter died in an accident 25 years ago. At night, Prathap meets Chakravarthy where he learns that Inspector Gopal Rao, Chakravarthy's close friend, was assigned to catch Rathanlal and Peter. Gopal Rao was also keen to catch Rathanlal and Peter as the boy (the acid attack victim) was his son. He successfully catches them. While transporting them to prison, the trio died in an accident.

Prathap also reveals that Nandanlal is actually connected to Shankarlal as Nandalal's house address matches Shankarlal's address. While leaving, he is captured by crime bosses named Robert and Jeevanlal, who demands to know why he was asking about Rathanlal and Peter, but Prathap doesn't budge where he also finds that Nandalal is in cahoots with Jeevanlal and Robert. Prathap creates a fake lie that he is their best friend's son, in order to escape from getting killed by them where he joins the gang and meets his girlfriend Rekha and they renew their relationship. Prathap learns about modes and operations of the gang, but his lie gets exposed. Jeevanlal and Robert tries to kill Prathap, but Prathap reveals about Shankarlal's diary and manages to save himself.

Nandanlal meets Prathap where he reveals himself as Shankarlal's son and demands to know about his father. Prathap ask him about Rathanlal and Peter, where Nandalal reveals that Jeevanlal and Robert are actually Rathanlal and Peter, who had faked their deaths after killing Gopal Rao in a car accident. Prathap reveals Shankarlal's death orchestrated by Ratanlal/Jeevanlal and Peter/Robert. Enraged, Nandalal heads to kill them, but Prathap stops and tells him not to act hastingly where he escapes with Nandalal's help. Nandanlal couldn't control his anger and kills Peter/Robert for killing Shankarlal, but is later killed by Ratanlal/Jeevanlal. Prathap meets Chakravarthy where he reveals his report and decide to swarm their hideout, but gets a call that Lakshmi has arrived in Mumbai to meet him.

Lakshmi is confrontated by Ratanlal/Jeevanlal's son Vijay (who had previously confronted Lakshmi) and tries to sleep with her, but is killed by Lakshmi where his friends take her to Ratanlal/Jeevanlal. Prathap heads to meet Ratanlal/Jeevanlal where he finds Lakshmi killed. Enraged, Prathap attacks Ratanlal/Jeevanlal's associates and confronts Ratanlal/Jeevanlal where he reveals about the boy, whose family suffered due to the acid attack on the boy. Prathap reveals that he is Gopal Rao's son and the boy by removing his face mask. Prathap thrashes a frightened Ratanlal/Jeevanlal, who soon dies. Chakravarthy, along with his team and Rekha are frightened to see Prathap, who leaves and reaches a sea shore where Rekha calls out to Prathap.

Cast

Production 
The director, Joe Simon in interview when asked about his experiences while filming Sahasa Simha said that at the climactic scene Vishnuvardhan was supposed to pass through a tunnel and at the end of the tunnel he is supposed to climb bricks and push a chamber cover to go outside. He said that the tunnel had insufficient oxygen to breath. Most of the crew including the director, cameraman and technicians started to feel breathless and finally he decided not to continue and to shoot the climax in a studio. But Vishnuvardhan insisted that the shot be completed than and there and asked the director to continue with the shooting. Finally the shooting of the climax was completed on the same day.

Soundtrack
The music was composed by Satyam.

Reception
The film was released on 10 February 1982. Upon release the film was critically acclaimed for its cast performances, action sequences and writing. Thoogudeepa Srinivas' portrayal of Peter was critically acclaimed. The film ran for over 25 weeks in theatres, and became Vishnuvardhan's biggest commercial success. The film was a turning point in his career, as he was catapulted into superstardom. Following the success of the film, a series of similar films of the action genre were made starring Vishnuvardhan in the lead role, modelled after Bachchan's angry young man persona. The film has over the years attained a cult status in Karnataka.

Re-release 
The film was re-released on 13 May 2016. The film became the first of Vishnuvardhan's films to be re-released. The film was released in CinemaScope with 5.1 D.T.S sound. The film upon re-release received good response. The opening day saw theatres having large cutout posters of Vishnuvardhan with fans flooding the movie halls.

Legacy
Sahasa Simha is considered to be the turning point in Vishnuvardhan's career as it shot him into superstardom in Kannada cinema. Even the dialogues from the movie are still famous today. The success of the film bestowed the title of Sahasa Simha and The Angry Young Man of Kannada Cinema on him. The film inspired a comic book series titled Sahasa Simha Comic series. The comic revolves around Detective Sahasa Simha who solves mysteries with the help of his grandchildren and fights stemmed through social issues. The protagonist of the comic is based on Vishnuvardhan whereas the grandchildren's characters are based upon the Vishnuvardhan's real-life grandkids Jyestavardhan and Shloka.

References

External links
 
 

1982 films
1980s science fiction action films
1980s Kannada-language films
1980s vigilante films
Indian vigilante films
Films scored by Satyam (composer)
1980s dystopian films
Indian science fiction action films
Indian post-apocalyptic films